David Carnegie, Sr. (8 February 1772, in Montrose, Angus – 10 January 1837) was a Scottish entrepreneur who founded D. Carnegie & Co. in Gothenburg, Sweden, today known as Carnegie Investment Bank.

See also
 Balquhidder
 Carnegie (disambiguation)

References

1772 births
1837 deaths
18th-century Scottish businesspeople
19th-century Scottish businesspeople
People from Montrose, Angus
Founders of utopian communities
Scottish philanthropists
Swedish philanthropists
Scottish expatriates in Sweden
19th-century Swedish businesspeople